is a railway station located in Mukō, Kyoto Prefecture, Japan. It serves the JR Kyoto Line (Tōkaidō Main Line) of West Japan Railway Company. The distances to major stations are 6.4 km to Kyoto Station, 36.4 km to Osaka Station and 520.0 km to Tokyo Station.

Trains 
Trains of the JR Kyoto Line except special rapid service trains stop at the station, and rapid service trains pass in the morning.

Station facilities 
The track runs north to south and the station building stands west of the tracks. On the tracks there are two island platforms. Tracks No. 2 and 3 are for passenger use, with Tracks No. 1 and 4 fenced off as all trains on the outer tracks pass through this station without stopping.

History 
Mukōmachi Station opened on 28 July 1876, as the first railway station in Kyoto Prefecture when the nation's second-oldest railway line connecting Osaka and Kobe was first extended towards Kyoto. The railway once terminated at Mukōmachi was extended to the temporary station of Kyoto on 5 September 1876.

Mukōmachi was the name of the predecessor town of the city of Mukō. When Mukō become a city in 1972, the two Hankyu stations were renamed from Nishi-Mukōmachi and Higashi-Mukōmachi respectively, but the name of JNR station was not changed.

Station numbering was introduced to the station in March 2018 with Mukōmachi being assigned station number JR-A34.

Environs 
South of the station is the large train yard called Kyoto Sōgō Untensho, a base of passenger trains of West Japan Railway. Higashi-Mukō Station of the Hankyu Kyoto Line is located about 0.5 km southwest of the station. A free bus service connects the station to Mukōmachi Keirinjō bicycle racecourse when keirin races are held there.

Adjacent stations

References

External links 
Mukōmachi Station (JR West official site) 

Railway stations in Kyoto Prefecture
Tōkaidō Main Line
Railway stations in Japan opened in 1876
Mukō